Jordan Chait (born 26 January 1997) is a South African rugby union player for the Tel Aviv Heat in the Rugby Europe Super Cup. He also plays for the Seattle Seawolves in Major League Rugby (MLR) in the U.S. His regular position is fly-half.

Profesional career
Chait was named in the  side for the 2022 Currie Cup Premier Division.

Chait made his Major League Rugby (MLR) debut for the Seattle Seawolves on February 18, 2023 against the New York Ironworkers. He was perfect in penalty kicks, going 6 for 6 in the victory. He was also awarded Man of the Match.

References

South African rugby union players
Living people
Rugby union fly-halves
Sharks (rugby union) players
Sharks (Currie Cup) players
1997 births
Tel Aviv Heat players
South African expatriate sportspeople in Israel
South African expatriate rugby union players
Expatriate rugby union players in Israel
Rugby union players from Cape Town
Seattle Seawolves players
South African expatriate sportspeople in the United States
Expatriate rugby union players in the United States